This is the discography of American blues musician Seasick Steve. He has released twelve studio albums, two compilation albums, one Extended play and ten singles. He made his first UK television appearance on Jools Holland's annual Hootenanny BBC TV show on New Year's Eve 2006.

Cheap, Steve's debut studio album, was released in 2004. It consists of songs by him and his Swedish/Norwegian band The Level Devils, and also two stories from his life as a hobo. The Level Devils consisted at this time of Kai Christoffersen playing the drums and Jo Husmo bass. Dan Magnusson subsequently took over drumming duties.

Dog House Music, Steve's second studio album, was released in November 2006. The album peaked at No. 36 on the UK Albums Chart. The album is almost entirely performed by Steve, apart from snare drum on "Yellow Dog" and crash cymbal on "Fallen Off a Rock", performed by H.J. Wold, and drums on the hidden track by Steve's son P.M. Wold.

I Started Out with Nothin and I Still Got Most of It Left, Steve's third studio album, was released in September 2008. The album peaked to No. 9 on the UK Albums Chart. The album is his first on the record label Warner Bros. Records, but the vinyl releases are still on his old label, Bronzerat Records.

Man from Another Time, Steve's fourth studio album, was released in October 2009. The album peaked to No. 4 on the UK Albums Chart.

You Can't Teach an Old Dog New Tricks, Steve's fifth studio album, was released in May 2011. The album peaked to No. 6 on the UK Albums Chart. The album features former Led Zeppelin bass guitarist John Paul Jones.

Hubcap Music, Steve's sixth studio album, was released in April 2013. The album peaked at No. 14 on the UK Albums Chart. The title derives from his Morris Minor guitar made out of two hubcaps placed back-to-back. Steve uses the guitar frequently, both live and in the studio. The song "Down On The Farm" was debuted live at the 2012 Pinkpop Festival in the Netherlands. A music video was also released, with Seasick Steve dancing behind his farm with the hubcap guitar in his hand, in similar fashion to The Black Keys' song, "Lonely Boy". One week before the release, a video for "Purple Shadows" premiered, featuring Steve playing a stripped version of the song on the acoustic guitar.

Sonic Soul Surfer, Steve's seventh studio album, was released in March 2015. It was promoted with 4 singles : "Bring It On", "Summertime Boy", "Roy's Gang", and "Barracuda '68". His eighth studio album was released on October 7 2016.

Albums

Studio albums

Compilation albums

Extended plays

Singles

As lead artist

Other charted songs

References

Discographies of American artists